Preview is the second EP by Australian singer-songwriter, Kym Campbell. Campbell toured in support of Preview across Australia and Japan in 2010. Campbell's release of "Preview" drew the attention of Japanese label Pony Canyon, leading to the release of Campbell's first full-length album, "Real Life" in 2011.

Track listing

Personnel
Credits for Preview are available on the EP cover notes. All songs written and arranged by Kym Campbell.

 Guitar & Vocals: Kym Campbell
 Lead Guitar, Piano, Bass, Drums & Percussion: Michael Stangel
 Hammond & Wurlitzer: Robbie Ragg
 Backing Vocals: Sophia Katos
 Percussion, Drums & Backing Vocals on 'Preview': Johnny Rollins
 Engineering & Production: Michael Stangel
 Mastering: Chris Athens
 Artwork: Larna Howard
 Photography: Tony Scott

References

2010 EPs